The EMD SD45-2 is a 6-axle diesel-electric locomotive built by General Motors Electro-Motive Division (EMD). EMD built 136 locomotives between 1972–1974, primarily for the Atchison, Topeka and Santa Fe Railway (ATSF). The SD45-2 was an improved version of the EMD SD45; the primary visual difference is the lack of flared radiators on the SD45-2.

Design 

Part of the EMD Dash 2 line, the SD45-2 was an upgraded SD45. Like the SD45, the SD45-2 had an EMD 645E3 20-cylinder engine producing . The main spotting difference between an SD45 and an SD45-2 was the long hood and the rear radiator. On the SD45 the long hood is flared whereas on the SD45-2 it is vertical and the rear cooling fans are more spread out on the top of the rear of the long hood. This unit used the same frame as the EMD SD40-2 and EMD SD38-2. The largest owner of the SD45-2 was the Atchison, Topeka, & Santa Fe with 90 units, the Clinchfield had 18 units, Seaboard Coast line had 15 units and Erie Lackawanna rostered 13 units.

A few cabless SD45-2Bs were built by Santa Fe from units undergoing remanufacturing. In all but one case (5510), the dynamic brakes were moved to the opposite end of the hood from the radiators; they were originally near the center of the hood. With no cab, these B-units are controlled from other locomotives.

In September 2015, Norfolk Southern revealed SD45-2 #1700, which was painted back to its Erie Lackawanna color scheme at Chattanooga, Tennessee. This is the second unit from an NS predecessor painted back into its original colors.

Preservation 
On August 31, 2018, CSX donated former SD45-2 #8954 (ex: SCL #2049) to the Southeastern Railway Museum in Duluth, GA, making it the first SD45-2 to be preserved.

On October 6th, 2021, BNSF donated SD45-2 #6484 (ex: ATSF #5704, one of 5 units to receive a bicentennial scheme) to the Southern California Railway Museum in Perris, CA, and is being restored to its ATSF Bicentennial scheme.

Original Owners

Notes

References 
 
 
 Sarberenyi, Robert. EMD SD45-2 Original Owners.
 Marta,H.A., Mels,K.D. and Itami,G.S. (1972), Design features and performance characteristics of the high traction three axle truck, ASME paper no. 72-RT-3.

External links 

SD45-2
C-C locomotives
Diesel-electric locomotives of the United States
Railway locomotives introduced in 1972
Freight locomotives
Standard gauge locomotives of the United States
Locomotives with cabless variants